Wales has both radio and television channels in the Welsh language.  This page lists some notable programmes transmitted on them.

Television programmes
Television programmes originally made in the Welsh language or first shown only in Wales.

 04 Wal
 35 Awr
 35 Diwrnod
 100 Lle 
 Adre 
 BANG
 Byw Celwydd
 Byw yn yr Ardd
 Con Passionate
 Cowbois ac Injans
 C'mon Midffild
 Caerdydd
 Cariad@iaith:love4language - broadcast since 2004
 Calennig
 Craith
 Cwpwrdd dillad
 Dal Ati 
 Dechrau Canu, Dechrau Canmol
 Glan Hafren
 Gofod
 Ffermio
 Fideo 9 - music programme broadcast from 1988 to 1992.
 Hacio
 Heno 
 Hip neu Sgip?
 Jacpot
 Jonathan - Jonathan Davies show broadcast since 2004
Llanw
 Newyddion
 Ochr 1
 Pam Fi Duw
 PARCH
 Pobol y Cwm - soap opera transmitted since 1974.
 Pwy 'dy Pwy
 Rownd a Rownd
 Teulu
 Tipyn o Stad
 Un Bore Mercher
 Yr Afon
 Y Byd ar Bedwar
 Y Byd yn ei Le
 Y Clwb Rygbi
 Y Ditectif (The Detective) - factual crime series fronted by Mali Harries
 Y Gwyll (Hinterland) - crime drama
 Y Lle
 Y Pris
 Y Siambr - game show
 Y Stiwdio Gefn - music programme
 Wedi 7 - daily news programme, replaced by Heno in 2012
 Wynne Evans ar Waith 

Children's films and television 

S4C has always had a strong children's broadcasting strand, many cartoons from which have later made the transition to channels in English and other languages.

 ABC Ari Awyren Siôn Blewyn Coch (1986) Beano and Friends find Stabec Bryn Seren Bwgan Caffi Sali Mali Caio Cyfres y Dywysoges Fach Cariad Cyntaf (1988) Dennis a Dannedd Deri Deg Gŵr y Gwyrthiau Hwre! Dyma Nodi Hotel Eddie Joshua Jones Llan-ar-goll-en Lisabeth Mona Y Fampir Miffi Pingu Planed Plant Prosiect Z Rala Rwdins Sali Mali Sam Tân Sgerbyde Slici a Slac Stabec SuperTed Tecwyn y Tractor Teletubbies Thumbelina (1994) Y Blobs Waaa! Y Brodyr Adrenalini Yr Ŵy Pasg (1987) Yr Injan Fach Fentrus Y Dywysoges a'r Bwgan Wil Cwac CwacRadio programmesC2'',  BBC Radio Cymru

References

Welsh television shows
-
programmes